Viktor Karpukhin may refer to:

 Viktor Anatolyevich Karpukhin (b. 1989), Russian footballer
 Viktor Fyodorovich Karpukhin (1947–2003), Soviet intelligence officer